Pietà Hotspurs Football Club is a Maltese football club based in Pietà, founded in 1968, the club currently plays in the Maltese Premier League.

History

Pietà Hotspurs had their league debut on 23 October 1934, but any success the club had hoped to achieve was postponed due to the outbreak of World War II. After the war's end, Pietà took part in the Anglo Maltese Football League, before joining the Third Division of the National Championships, where they spent ten seasons. Pietà Hotspurs, however, were replaced in the league with Pietà Atlanta in 1962, a team which later changed their name to Pietà Hotspurs in 1973, joining the Fourth Division in 1974. The team won the league and promotion, but spent ten years in the Third Division. They eventually won promotion in 1985, but were soon relegated again. However, they bounced back up and won promotion again in 1988. In 1994 they finally won promotion to the Premier Division.

The club's football nursery has acquired a fame of producing talented footballers such as Cleavon Frendo, Massimo Grima, Valeri Bojinov, Saviour Darmanin and Attila Filkor, as well as Jovica Milijić, a Maltese futsal player of Serbian descent.

Players

Current squad

External links
 Official website

 
Football clubs in Malta
1968 establishments in Malta
Pietà, Malta
Association football clubs established in 1968